Heinrich Khunrath (c. 1560 – 9 September 1605), or Dr. Henricus Khunrath as he was also called, was a German physician, hermetic philosopher, and alchemist. Frances Yates considered him to be a link between the philosophy of John Dee and Rosicrucianism. His name, in the spelling "Henricus Künraht" was used as a pseudonym for the 1670 publisher of the Tractatus Theologico-Politicus of Baruch Spinoza.

Life and education 
Khunrath was born in Dresden, Saxony, the son of the merchant Sebastian Kunrat and his wife Anna in the year 1560. He was the younger brother of the Leipzig physician Conrad Khunrath. In the winter of 1570, he may have enrolled at the University of Leipzig under the name of Henricus Conrad Lips. The uncertainties surrounding his life stem from his supposed use of multiple names. It is certain that in May 1588, he matriculated at the University of Basel, Switzerland, earning his Medicinæ Doctor degree on 3 September 1588, after a defense of twenty-eight doctoral theses.

Career 
Khunrath, a disciple of Paracelsus, practiced medicine in Dresden, Magdeburg, and Hamburg and may have held a professorial position in Leipzig. He travelled widely after 1588, including a stay at the Imperial court in Prague, home to the mystically inclined Habsburg emperor Rudolf II. Before reaching Prague he had met John Dee at Bremen on 27 May 1589, when Dee was on his way back to England from Bohemia.  Khunrath praised Dee in his later works.  During his court stay Khunrath met the alchemist Edward Kelley who had remained behind after he and Dee had parted company (Kelley was arrested on 30 April 1591 as an alleged imposter). In September 1591, Khunrath was appointed court physician to Count Rosemberk in Trebona. He probably met Johann Thölde while at Trebona, one of the suggested authors of the "Basilius Valentinus" treatises on alchemy.

Hermetic alchemist 

Khunrath's brushes with John Dee and Thölde and Paracelsian beliefs led him to develop a Christianized natural magic, seeking to find the secret prima materia that would lead man into eternal wisdom. The Christianized view that Khunrath took was framed around his commitment to Lutheran theology. He also held that experience and observation were essential to practical alchemical research, as would a natural philosopher.

His most famous work on alchemy is the Amphitheatrum Sapientiae Aeternae (Amphitheater of Eternal Wisdom), a work on the mystical aspects of that art, which contains the oft-seen engraving entitled "The First Stage of the Great Work", better-known as the "Alchemist's Laboratory". The book was first published at Hamburg in 1595, with four circular elaborate, hand-colored, engraved plates heightened with gold and silver which Khunrath designed and were engraved by Paullus van der Doort. The book was then made more widely available in an expanded edition with the addition of other plates published posthumously in Hanau in 1609. Amphitheatrum Sapientiae Aeternae is an alchemical classic, combining both Christianity and magic. In it, Khunrath showed himself to be an adept of spiritual alchemy and illustrated the many-staged and intricate path to spiritual perfection. Khunrath's work was important in Lutheran circles. John Warwick Montgomery has pointed out that Johann Arndt (1555–1621), who was the influential writer of Lutheran books of pietiesm and devotion, composed a commentary on Amphitheatrum. Some of the ideas in his works are Kabbalistic in nature and foreshadow Rosicrucianism.

Death 
Khunrath may have encountered some opposition to his alchemical work because most of his publications on alchemy were published widely after his death. He died in either Dresden or Leipzig on 9 September 1605. The tension between spirituality and experiment in Amphitheatrum Sapientiae Aeternae brought about its condemnation by the Sorbonne in 1625.

Writings 
 
 
  - Reprint of the first (Hamburg 1595) and second (last) edition (Hanau 1609), together with a transcription of a German translation (18th century).

References

Further reading

External links

 University of Wisconsin-Madison site on Khunrath's Amphitheatrum sapientiae aeternae including biography and bibliography.
 The naturall Chymicall Symboll or short Confession of Doctor Kunwrath
 Khunrath Portrait
 Heinrich Khunrath at the Galileo Project
 A Philosophicall short songe of the incorporating of the Spirit of the Lord in Salt (archive)
 "An Interpretation of the Alchemy Lab Drawing" by John Read
 The Alchemy of the Amphitheatrum - a 2012 webinar by Peter Forshaw about Heinrich Khunrath on the website of the Ritman Library, Amsterdam.
 A Not-So-Lazy Henry: Heinrich Khunrath in his Laboratory - 2022 online seminar of the Society for the History of Alchemy and Chemistry given by Peter Forshaw

1605 deaths
German occultists
German astrologers
16th-century astrologers
17th-century astrologers
German alchemists
Christian Kabbalists
16th-century German physicians
Paracelsians
Year of birth uncertain
1560 births
17th-century German physicians
16th-century German writers
16th-century German male writers
17th-century German writers
17th-century German male writers
16th-century alchemists
17th-century alchemists